Torsten Lachmann (born 29 April 1982 in Schwedt, East Germany) is a German-born, Australian sprint canoeist who competed in the late 2000s. At the 2008 Summer Olympics in Beijing, he was eliminated in the semifinals of both the C-1 500 m and the C-1 1000 m events.

References
 Sports-Reference.com profile

1982 births
Australian male canoeists
Canoeists at the 2008 Summer Olympics
Living people
Olympic canoeists of Australia
Australian people of German descent